Guoxing Avenue is a major street in Haikou, Hainan, China. It runs in an east-west direction in the heart of the city. Its west end terminates at Longkun Road and its east end terminates at the Qiongzhou Bridge which crosses the Nandu River.

History

Guoxing Avenue was once Haikou's main airport (since relocated to Haikou Meilan International Airport southeast of the city centre). Built around 2005, the avenue was first seldom used for vehicular traffic route. Most of the land on the north and south sides were unoccupied. It has since become a heavily trafficked road.

In 2017, the west end was connected to a newly built road that provides access to the new neighbourhood 'Haikou West Coast' located around 7 km west of the Haikou city centre. The east end of Guoxing connects to the route to Haikou Meilan International Airport.

Notable locations
Guoxing can be considered as having two parts separated by the north-south Haifu Road:

West
The west part contains the following:

 A group of apartment and office buildings on the extreme west end on both the north and south sides
 HNA Building, the headquarters of Hainan Airlines 
 International Tourism and Central Business District, a cluster of new office towers 
 Riyue Mall, the largest plaza in the city
 Haikou Tower complex, under-construction
 Hainan Government Planning Exhibition Centre

East
The east part contains the following:

 The Meishe River flows under Guoxing approximately 250 metres east of Haifu Road
 Hainan Museum
 Hainan Library
 Hainan Centre for the Performing Arts
 Shopping mall
 Haikou College of Economics, just off Guoxing
 Hainan Provincial P.E. Games Centre, a sports arena just off Guoxing
 Hainan Provincial Public Servants' Committee

References

External links
 

Streets in China
Haikou
Roads in Haikou